Brynbach was a National Campsite of the Scout Association, situated near Saron in Denbighshire in North Wales. The 200-acre site had its heyday between the 1930s and the late 1950s. It had naturalistic wooden entrance gates designed by Lord Baden Powell, the founder of Scouting. 

An outline of the Fleur de Lys, the Scouting emblem, was created by planting Golden Larch trees in the surrounding woods.

Demise
The original owner of Brynbach camp died in the early 1960s. Although the continued use of the camp by the Cheshire Scouting Association was a provision in her will, her beneficiaries withdrew from that agreement. Occasional troops were permitted to use the site but access was strictly limited. The last camps were held in the late 1980s and early 1990s.

References

External links
Boy Scouts Camp in 1930
16th Royal Eltham Scout Troop at Brynbach Scout Camp August 1936
Brynbach Boy Scouts Camp c.1938
1946 Cheshire Rally at Brynbach with Chief Scout Lord Rowallan in attendance
Brynbach's Swimming Pool

Campsites of The Scout Association
Buildings and structures in Denbighshire